Dark Star is a 1984 ZX Spectrum shoot 'em up developed and published by Design Design.

Gameplay

Development

Reception

Dark Star received positive reception from video game critics.

References

External links

Dark Star original source code  at Design Design

1984 video games
ZX Spectrum-only games
ZX Spectrum games
Shoot 'em ups
Video games developed in the United Kingdom